Metea is an unincorporated community in Bethlehem Township, Cass County, Indiana.

History
Metea was originally known as New Hamilton, and under the latter name laid out in 1853. It was later renamed Metea, the name of an Indian chief.

Geography
Indiana State Road 25 passes northeast through town.

References

Unincorporated communities in Cass County, Indiana
Unincorporated communities in Indiana